Ajayaraja is a given name. Notable people with the name include:

 Ajayaraja I (r.  721-734), Shakambhari Chahamana king of India
 Ajayaraja II (r.  1110-1135), Shakambhari Chahamana king of India

Masculine given names